Matevž (puréed beans with cracklings) is a Slovene national dish. The dish is typical of central Slovenia, especially of the Kočevje region. It is made of beans and potatoes. Its origins come from the 19th century. Originally, the lower social classes ate it as a main course. The dish is also known as krompirjev mož 'potato mush' (cf. Gottschee German muož 'mush'), belokranjski mož 'White Carniola mush', or medved (literally, 'bear'). The term matevž is a derivative from male name Matej or Matevž (Matthew). Matej or Matevž word origins to many other dialectical expressions: to have matevža means to have a hangover.

It is mostly served as a side dish. It is usually eaten with sauerkraut or turnips.

Preparation
Overnight soaked beans put in cold water, add butter and laurel leaf, then boil. Separately, cook peeled potatoes, strain water, add butter, sour cream, and cracklings. Mix cooked beans with buttered potatoes and purée. Add garlic.

See also 

 List of legume dishes
 Slovenian cuisine

References

External links
 Matevž with photo

Slovenian cuisine
Legume dishes